A naval surgeon, or less commonly ship's doctor, is the person responsible for the health of the ship's company aboard a warship. The term appears often in reference to Royal Navy's medical personnel during the Age of Sail.

Ancient uses
Specialised crew members capable of providing medical care have been a feature of military vessels for at least two thousand years. The second-century Roman Navy under Emperor Hadrian included a surgeon aboard each of its triremes, with the position earning twice a regular officer's pay.

Royal Navy
During the Age of Sail, the Royal Navy carried trained medical officers aboard its warships, who usually learned their trade before coming on board ship.  They were generally called surgeons.  The Navy Board qualified surgeons through an examination at the Barber-Surgeons' Company and they were responsible to the Sick and Wounded Board under the Navy Board. Surgeons were required to keep two logbooks detailing treatments and procedures carried out under their care; at the conclusion of any voyage these were to be delivered one to the Barber-Surgeons' Company and one to Greenwich Hospital.

Warranted Naval Medical officers, similar to doctors on shore, were not required to have a medical degree and were generally trained by apprenticeship.  By 1814, the Royal Navy had 14 physicians, 850 surgeons, 500 assistants surgeons caring for 130,000 men on shore and at sea.  They were very well paid, starting at £14 per month in 1815 for surgeons with less than 6 years of experience, up to £25 4s for 20 years of experience.  They were also allowed £43 for equipment, £5 for every 100 cases of venereal disease they treated, and a personal servant.  Factoring in prize money, a ship's surgeon could make well over £200 a year.

Rank
Surgeons were ranked by the Navy Board based on their training and social status.  Surgeons were wardroom warrant officers with a high status, billeted along with the other officers in the wardroom.  Until the Navy's medical services were reorganized in 1806, surgeons were warranted by individual ship captains, not commissioned by the Admiralty.  After 1808, surgeons, like masters, were considered equivalent to commissioned officers and were 'Warrant officers of Wardroom Rank'.

Surgeons were assisted by surgeon's mates, who after 1805 were called assistant surgeons.  The surgeon and his mates were assisted by boys, who were called loblolly boys, named after the gruel commonly served in the sick bay.  A small number of doctors with a prestigious medical education were ranked as physicians; they would supervise surgeons on ships or run hospitals on shore.

Duties 
The surgeon's duties included responsibility for his mates and loblolly boys, visiting patients at least twice a day, and keeping accurate records on each patient admitted to his care.  The surgeon would take morning sick call at the mainmast, assisted by his mates, as well as tending to injured sailors during the day.  During sea battles, the surgeon worked in the cockpit, a space permanently partitioned off near a hatchway down which the wounded could be carried for treatment.  The deck was strewn with sand prior to battle to prevent the surgeon from slipping in the blood that accumulated.

In addition to caring for the sick and wounded, surgeons were responsible for regulating sanitary conditions on the ship.  They fumigated the sick bay and sometimes whole decks by burning brimstone (sulfur), and maintained the ventilating machines that supplied fresh air to the lower decks to keep them dry.

Notable naval surgeons

Historical
He was a naturalist and explorer; Bass Strait is named in his honour.
 William Balmain (1762–1803) was a Scottish-born naval surgeon and civil administrator who sailed as an assistant surgeon with the First Fleet to establish the European settlement in Australia, and later became principal surgeon for New South Wales.
He tended the mortally wounded Admiral Nelson, and wrote an account of the battle.
 William Ruschenberger (1807–1895), naturalist and surgeon aboard , as well as the namesake of the boa Corallus ruschenbergerii
 Thomas Henry Huxley (1825–1895), anatomist known as "Darwin's Bulldog", was assistant ship's surgeon early in his career, on 
 Timothy Blair McLean (1910–1982), Canadian Surgeon-General, served as a medical officer and surgeon aboard  during the Second World War

Fictional

 Stephen Maturin, one of the main characters of Patrick O'Brian's Aubrey-Maturin series
 Lemuel Gulliver, main character of Johnathan Swift's Gulliver's Travels
 Yoshikage Kira, side character of Hirohiko Araki's JoJolion

Footnotes

References

External links 
 Kaji Sritharan, Maritime medicine, April 15, 2006, BMJ Careers advice
 Ship's Doctor, a P&O website
 Ship's doctor's work far from fiction, Peggy Peck, August 3, 2005

Nautical terminology
Marine occupations